Silvano Meconi (28 October 1931 – 22 September 2005) was an Italian shot putter who won two medals at Mediterranean Games.

Biography
He competed at the 1956, 1960 and 1964 Olympics and finished in 10th, 13th and 17th place, respectively. From 1955 to 1969 he took part in 47 international competitions and won 13 national titles.

See also
 Italian Athletics Championships – Multi winners
 Italy national athletics team – More caps
 Shot put winners of Italian Athletics Championships

References

External links
 

1931 births
2005 deaths
Italian male shot putters
Olympic athletes of Italy
Athletes (track and field) at the 1956 Summer Olympics
Athletes (track and field) at the 1960 Summer Olympics
Athletes (track and field) at the 1964 Summer Olympics
Mediterranean Games gold medalists for Italy
Mediterranean Games bronze medalists for Italy
Athletes (track and field) at the 1955 Mediterranean Games
Athletes (track and field) at the 1963 Mediterranean Games
Mediterranean Games medalists in athletics
20th-century Italian people
21st-century Italian people